Rachel Davis may refer to:

 Rachel Cory Hutchins, née Davis, a character from the soap opera Another World
 Rachel Davis (musician), fiddler from Cape Breton Island, Nova Scotia